Whannell is a surname. Notable people with the surname include:

 Dan Whannell (1899–1929), former Australian rules footballer
 Leigh Whannell (born 1977), Australian screenwriter, actor, film producer and film director